Anthony Roger Mellows,  (29 July 1936 – 10 January 2016) was an English solicitor, academic and British Army officer. Until June 2014 (having succeeded Colonel Eric Barry, in 2008), he served as Lord Prior of the Order of Saint John, the order's most senior non-royal office.

Career

Military career
Mellows began his military career in the British Army by joining the other ranks, rising to the rank of sergeant. On 27 January 1959, he was commissioned in the TA Intelligence Corps, as a second lieutenant (probationary). On 1 January 1964, he was promoted captain and seconded to the staff. On 1 April 1967, he transferred to the newly created Territorial and Army Volunteer Reserve as a captain in the Intelligence Corps. On 18 November 1970, he was placed on the Regular Army Reserve of Officers list.

Academic career
Mellows was Professor of Law in the University of London and served as Head of the Department of Law at King's College London and Dean of the Faculty of Laws of the University of London.

Order of St John
In May 1981, Mellows was appointed an Officer of the Most Venerable Order of Saint John (OStJ), in April 1985, he was promoted to the grade of Commander (CStJ); in 1988, he was raised to Knight of Justice (KJStJ); and, in July 1991, he was advanced as Bailiff Grand Cross of the Order of Saint John (GCStJ), its highest grade. He also was decorated with the St John Service Medal.

Other honours
In 1969, he received the Territorial Decoration (TD) awarded for long service as a Territorial Army officer. In the 2003 New Year Honours, he was appointed Officer of the Order of the British Empire (OBE) "for services to the Church of England".

Honour Ribbons

 : Order of the British Empire (OBE)
 : Bailiff Grand Cross of the Order of St John (GCStJ)
 : Territorial Decoration (TD)
 : Service Medal of the Order of St John

References

 
 

1936 births
2016 deaths
English solicitors
Academics of the University of London
Academics of King's College London
British Army soldiers
Intelligence Corps officers
British Anglicans
Bailiffs Grand Cross of the Order of St John
Officers of the Order of the British Empire